Trolls: The Beat Goes On! is an American animated web television series produced by DreamWorks Animation that is based on the 3D computer-animated musical comedy film Trolls. The series was released on Netflix on January 19, 2018, and concluded on November 22, 2019.

A total of 8 seasons and 52 episodes containing 103 episode segments have been released.

Series overview

Episodes

Season 1 (2018)

Season 2 (2018)

Season 3 (2018)

Season 4 (2018)

Season 5 (2019)

Season 6 (2019)

Season 7 (2019)

Season 8 (2019)

References 

Lists of American children's animated television series episodes